Soledad is a 1947 Mexican drama film directed by Miguel Zacarías and starring Libertad Lamarque, René Cardona and Marga López.

Plot
Soledad Somellera (Libertad Lamarque), an Argentine maid, secretly marries the son of her employers, Roberto Covarrubias (René Cardona). However, Roberto abandons her soon after to marry a wealthy woman, revealing to Soledad that their wedding was staged and thus not valid. Soledad runs away, pregnant with Roberto's child, although soon after, Roberto's mother locates her and convinces him to give up her daughter so that she can grow up without suffering hardships. Soledad becomes a famous singer, adopting the stage name of Cristina Palermo, while her daughter, Evangelina (Marga López), grows into a spoiled brat who, when she has the opportunity to meet Palermo, treats her with contempt, ignoring that she is his mother.

Cast
Libertad Lamarque as Soledad Somellera / Cristina Palermo
René Cardona as Roberto Covarrubias
Marga López as Evangelina
Rubén Rojo as Carlos
Consuelo Guerrero de Luna as Marina
Rafael Alcayde as Arturo (as Rafael Alcaide)
Prudencia Grifell as Roberto's mother
Elena Contla as Petra, maid
Pepe Martínez as Evaristo (as Pepito Martinez)
Armida Bracho as Elena
Alicia Caro as Florist (uncredited)
José Escanero as Don Paco, licenciado (uncredited)
Ana María Hernández as Dinner guest (uncredited)
Salvador Lozano as Doctor (uncredited)
Rubén Márquez as Man in restaurant (uncredited)
Elda Peralta as Evangelina's friend (uncredited)
Ignacio Peón as Witness at wedding (uncredited)
Félix Samper as Man in restaurant (uncredited)
Armando Sáenz as Carlos's friend (uncredited)

Reception
Soledad was the second film made by Libertad Lamarque in Mexico, after Luis Buñuel's Gran Casino (1946). Several film critics, such as Isaac León Frías, Stuart A. Day, and others, considered the film as a recovery for Lamarque after Gran Casino did not have a favorable reception.

References

External links

1947 drama films
1947 films
Mexican drama films
Films directed by Miguel Zacarías
Films scored by Manuel Esperón
Mexican black-and-white films
1940s Mexican films